This is a list of all lighthouses in the U.S. state of Washington as identified by the United States Coast Guard. There are eighteen active lights in the state; three are standing but inactive, three were supplanted by automated towers, and two have been completely demolished. Two lights, one of them still active, serve as museums.

The Cape Disappointment Light was the first lighthouse in the state (lit 1856) and is still active.

If not otherwise noted, focal height and coordinates are taken from the United States Coast Guard Light List, while location and dates of activation, automation, and deactivation are taken from the United States Coast Guard Historical information site for lighthouses.

References

Washington (state)
 
Lighthouses
Lighthouses